Luke Ricketson (born 5 February 1973) is an Australian former professional rugby league footballer who played in the 1990s and 2000s. An Australian and Ireland international, and New South Wales State of Origin representative back-row forward, he played his entire club football career for the Sydney Roosters of the National Rugby League (NRL).

Early life
Ricketson was born in Forster, New South Wales, Australia.

Son of former Easts player, Doug Ricketson. He started playing junior rugby league at the age of seven for Bondi United in 1980. He was then graded with Eastern Suburbs as a local junior, debuting in first grade in round 22 of 1991 season.

Playing career

Ricketson played at lock for the Sydney Roosters in their 2000 NRL Grand Final loss to the Brisbane Broncos.

In 2002, Ricketson broke the record held by Roosters club legend Kevin Hastings (217) for the most club appearances. In 2014, Ricketson's eventual 301 caps, achieved upon his retirement in 2005 was overtaken by Anthony Minichiello (302). This record was subsequently surpassed by Mitchell Aubusson (306) in 2020. 

Ricketson played for the Roosters at lock forward in their 2002 NRL Grand Final victory against the New Zealand Warriors. Having won the 2002 NRL Premiership, the Roosters traveled to England to play the 2003 World Club Challenge against Super League champions, St Helens R.F.C. Ricketson played at lock forward in Sydney's victory.

In the 2003 NRL grand final, he played at lock forward for the Roosters in their loss to the Panthers.

Ricketson retired from rugby league after the 2005 NRL season having played 301 games for the Roosters, the last season as captain. He played his 300th (and penultimate) game in round 25, 2005, against the Brisbane Broncos at Suncorp Stadium; the Roosters marked the milestone by winning the match 17–10.

Representative career
In 1996, Ricketson was first picked for City Origin. He played again for City in 1997 but had to wait until 1999 to make his State of Origin début for NSW, coming off the bench in all three games.

He made his international début when he played four games for Ireland at the 2000 Rugby League World Cup.

Ricketson made his début for Australia in 2003 playing in two tests at lock against New Zealand. After that he was selected to go on the 2003 Kangaroo tour, on which he played all three tests against Great Britain as Australia retained The Ashes winning all three games. Ricketson scored two tries in the last test at the McAlpine Stadium in Huddersfield.

Post playing
He appeared on the fourth series on the Australian version of Dancing with the Stars.

Personal life
Ricketson is married to journalist Kate Waterhouse who is the daughter of horse trainer Gai Waterhouse. They have 2 children.

References

External links
NRL profile
(archived by web.archive.org) State of Origin Official website Rugby League Player Stats
Ricketson – helped Ireland reach last eight in 2000
Luke Ricketson Statistics at rugbyleagueproject.org
Luke Ricketson profile

1973 births
Living people
Australia national rugby league team players
Australian people of Irish descent
Australian rugby league players
Ireland national rugby league team players
New South Wales City Origin rugby league team players
New South Wales Rugby League State of Origin players
Prime Minister's XIII captains
Prime Minister's XIII players
Rugby league locks
Rugby league players from New South Wales
Rugby league second-rows
Sydney Roosters players
Sydney Roosters captains